Augustus Lawson (born 24 May 1930, date of death unknown) was a Ghanaian sprinter. He competed in the men's 4 × 100 metres relay at the 1952 Summer Olympics.

References

1930 births
Year of death missing
Athletes (track and field) at the 1952 Summer Olympics
Athletes (track and field) at the 1958 British Empire and Commonwealth Games
Ghanaian male sprinters
Olympic athletes of Ghana
Place of birth missing
Commonwealth Games competitors for Ghana
20th-century Ghanaian people